The HTC One X is a touchscreen-based, slate-sized smartphone designed and manufactured by HTC. It was released running Android 4.0.3, (upgradeable to 4.2.2) with the HTC Sense 4.0 skin (later upgradeable to 5.0). The One X is powered by the NVIDIA Tegra 3 for most international GSM carriers, making this the first HTC phone to be equipped with a quad-core processor, while a variant which is LTE capable is powered by the Qualcomm Snapdragon S4 dual-core 1.5 GHz Krait processor. The One X was announced on February 26, 2012 at the Mobile World Congress and was HTC's sixth flagship product, leading the HTC One series from the time of its release through April 2013, when its successor the HTC One (M7) was announced.

Specifications

Software 
The One X shipped with the Android 4.0.4 mobile operating system with the HTC Sense 4.0 graphical user interface.  The upgrade to Android 4.2.2 with Sense 5 is available for most regions like Asia, Europe, Middle East, the Americas, and Australia. 25 GB of Dropbox storage is offered free for two years.

Some users have noticed that multitasking does not work on the HTC One X as it does in stock Android 4.0 Ice Cream Sandwich since the system more aggressively terminates apps in the background. HTC has explained that they customized Android on the One X so that HTC Sense has priority over background apps when memory is low.

On July 20, 2012, HTC confirmed that the One X, along with the One S, would be receiving a firmware update to Android 4.1 Jelly Bean, however did not announce a release schedule for these improvements. The refreshed One X+ comes with Android 4.1 Jelly Bean. By mid-November and early December, the Android 4.1.1 update began rolling out worldwide, bringing many new features and improvements such as the Google Now implementation, Project Butter giving it an overall smoother UI and battery optimizations which help improve battery life and to quell overheating. On June 20, 2013, a functional Ubuntu Touch build was made available for download. The HTC One X, The 2013 HTC One plus also The HTC Butterfly and the refreshed version of the HTC One X, called the One X+ was promised an update by HTC to the latest version Android 4.2.2 and the new Sense version 5 in the near future and just a few days later on the 19th of August, the update officially began rolling out to the One X, bringing it up to date with the newest sense version, Sense 5 UI, Android version 4.2.2, Quick Toggles and many software improvements found in the 2013 HTC One.

Hardware 
The One X is powered by a NVIDIA Tegra 3 system on a chip with a 1.5 GHz quad-core ARM Cortex-A9 MPCore CPU for most international GSM networks, or a 1.5 GHz dual-core Qualcomm Snapdragon S4 Krait (MSM8960) SoC with an integrated on-die LTE (4G) primarily for North American LTE carriers. It features 1 GB of RAM; a 1,800 mAh battery, a dual-band 802.11n WiFi radio, Bluetooth 4.0 with aptX, GPS, and NFC. It comes with 16 or 32 GB of internal storage but does not feature external storage. The One X also features a standard array of sensors including a digital compass, proximity sensor, gyroscope, accelerometer and ambient light sensor.

The One X has three physical keys; a power button on the top and higher and lower volume buttons on the right side. On the front of the One X are three capacitive touch keys for the Back, Home, and Recent Application functions.

On the left side of the One X is a Micro USB 2.0 port. This port doubles as a MHL interface, allowing the One X to output 1080p content to an external display via HDMI through the use of an adapter. A 3.5 mm headphone jack is located on the top of the One X as well as one of the two stereo microphones. The second microphone is located on the bottom. The One X has two speakers, a loudspeaker on the rear of the phone and a speaker above the front display, serving as the earpiece. The front speaker grill also houses the notification LED, which flashes green for notifications, flashes red for low battery, and illuminates red when the phone is charging.

The rear of the One X has the raised camera dome, and the flash for the accompanying camera.  In addition, another distinguishing feature of the rear of the One X are the five charging pins or "Pogo Pins".  On the AT&T variant of the One X, and the One X+, AT&T has moved these pins to a different position, resulting in the AT&T models being incompatible with the vast majority of accessories that make use of these charging pins.

Display 
The One X features a  1,280x720 pixel (RGB matrix) Super LCD 2 display, with a pixel density of 312 pixels per inch, covered by a single pane of Corning Gorilla Glass 2.0.

Battery 
The One X features a 1,800 mAh battery. For the One series, HTC spent thousands of man hours on a Battery Stamina Boost Project due to general consumer complaints about the notably poor battery life of previous HTC devices. HTC researched "the SoC, networking, display, operating system and preloaded applications" in order to improve battery life.

Audio 

The device comes with a Beats Audio equalizer. While the One X typically includes a set of Beats by Dr. Dre headphones, the device only comes with a standard set of white headphones in the UK, Sweden, Germany, Singapore and Saudi Arabia. In Canada on Rogers and the United States on AT&T, the standard retail packaging does not include any headset. In Australia, the device includes a set of color-matched HTC-branded headphones.

Camera 
The rear-facing camera has an 8-megapixel back-illuminated sensor with a maximum aperture of f/2, autofocus, an LED flash dubbed HTC Smart Flash with three levels of brightness (determined by distance from the subject), and a dedicated imaging chip. With a startup time of 0.7 seconds and 0.2 seconds per shot, it beats even the Samsung Galaxy Nexus in camera speed. The camera can record 1080p video at 24 frames per second and 10 megabit/s in h.264 with the baseline profile, with stereo audio. The flashlight can be toggled during recording. It can take four photos per second while recording video. It also has slow motion video capture and playback (768 × 432 pixels) at an unspecified sensor frame rate. The output video is measured at a third of real-time speed. Shooting modes include High Dynamic Range (HDR) and panorama. 
The One X does not feature a physical_camera_button.

The front-facing camera has a resolution of 1.3 megapixels. It is capable of 720p, 30 frames per second recording at 5 megabits/s, also in h.264 baseline.

The image processor is HTC's ImageChip, a part used in common with other devices in the HTC One series (2012 models like the HTC One S and One V). According to HTC, ImageChip removes noise, balances color, and extends depth of field. The software is HTC's ImageSense.

Model variants

One X (North America) / One XL 
The HTC One X LTE for North America has been carried by Rogers Wireless in Canada since  and AT&T Mobility in the United States since . It is 0.4 mm longer than the international model, and features a 1.5 GHz dual-core Qualcomm Snapdragon S4 (MSM8960) SoC with an integrated on-die LTE (4G) modem instead of the Nvidia Tegra 3 which requires an external modem and is LTE-incompatible, and 16 GB of internal storage instead of 32 GB. AT&T cites incompatibility between Nvidia's Tegra 3 processor and LTE radios currently available on the market as the reason for the difference in processors. Benchmarks have shown the battery life of the Snapdragon S4 variant to be marginally better than the Tegra 3 version for various common tasks, except for web browsing where the North American model placed 15-30% better. This is primarily due to a smaller manufacturing process, 28 nm, of the Snapdragon S4 SoC compared to 40 nm for the Nvidia Tegra 3 inside the international HTC One X.

The AT&T version omits many apps, including Voice Recorder, Polaris Office, FM Radio, Flashlight, and Dropbox. It adds many AT&T apps, including AT&T Code scanner, AT&T FamilyMap, AT&T Navigator, AT&T Ready2Go, Device Help, Live TV, and myAT&T.

In markets outside of North America where the Snapdragon S4 (LTE) is sold alongside the Tegra 3 (most international GSM), the Snapdragon S4 variant is branded as the HTC One XL. The device is almost identical to the North American version, using a dual-core Qualcomm Snapdragon S4 MSM8960 SoC with an LTE-capable modem in place of the Nvidia Tegra 3 quad core SoC, but is also available in both 16 GB and 32 GB versions.

The CDMA variant which is known as the Evo 4G LTE, released exclusively for Sprint, features largely the same hardware as the HTC One X LTE, but adds a MicroSD slot and a kickstand which is popular with users of the HTC Evo 4G (WiMax).

United States import ban 
On 15 May 2012, shipments of both the One X and the Evo 4G LTE were delayed by U.S. Customs by order of the International Trade Commission, to ensure that its software complied with an import ban imposed on HTC involving a patent owned by Apple. The patent covers software that converts phone numbers and email addresses in text into links and presents a menu of possible actions when these links are tapped. On May 21, 2012, the Taipei Times reported that the HTC One X and HTC EVO 4G LTE shipment had cleared US Customs and was entering the United States. To comply with the ruling, the software on North American models will not follow Android's default behavior of offering a menu of apps in these circumstances, instead certain apps are assigned by default and the settings menu contains extra options for changing these associations.

One XC 
The HTC One XC is a Chinese variant of the One X, which bears similar specifications to the dual core LTE version. Its body strongly resembles the Evo 4G LTE, but has a golden band instead of the red kickstand and a golden rim around the rear camera lens.

One XT 
The HTC One XT is another Chinese variant of the One X which is exclusive to China Mobile. It is identical to the international quad core version, but is designed to run on China Mobile's TD-SCDMA network instead of GSM.

One X+ 
The HTC One X+ was unveiled on October 2, 2012. It is a refreshed version of the One X with a new red and grey or white casing, 64 GB of storage, a larger 2100 mAh battery, an updated Nvidia Tegra 3 clocked at 1.7 GHz, support for GLONASS and an improved front camera (1.6 megapixels, f/2.2). It runs on Android 4.1 Jelly Bean with an update to HTC Sense UI named "Sense 4+". The North American version has a Qualcomm MDM9215 modem for LTE usage. Currently the North American version is exclusive to AT&T in the US and Telus in Canada. It is only available in black and has white Beats logo on the back and white accents on its buttons instead of red. Although the One X+ on AT&T received the update to Android 4.2, the Telus version never officially received the update. It has been announced that HTC One X+ would not get further updates, although it did receive a patch for the Heartbleed security vulnerability. The last Android version to run on is Android 4.2.2.

Model comparison table

Reception 
The HTC One X which features ImageSense and Beats Audio won two awards at the Mobile World Congress held on February 25, 2012 in Barcelona, firstly, the "Best Smartphone of MWC" by Laptop Magazine and secondly, the "Best in Show" award by Tom's Hardware.

The HTC One X received positive reviews from technology review sites. Chris Ziegler of The Verge gave the phone an overall score of 8.4 out of 10, listing the design, display and camera UI as the best features of the phone, while Sense 4.0, image/video quality, and battery life could not be better. He writes, "[the] One X isn’t just one of the best Android phones I’ve ever used — it’s one of the best mobile devices I’ve ever used, period." Tech reviewing websites CNET and Engadget have described the HTC One X as "one of the greatest phones of all time."

Brent Rose of Gizmodo writes that "The HTC One X is easily better than the iPhone 4S" and "The screen is most definitely better, there are many more features, and the design is far superior, and the larger screen size is a definite plus", conceding that to not like this device, "you must be insane." Rose went on to say "By the beard of Zeus, the screen! The 4.7-inch Super LCD2 is simply the best screen on a mobile device. Ever." In a review by The Verge, Chris Ziegler writes that the "One X's display is, without a hint of hyperbole, the best I've ever seen on a phone. Full stop. Seriously, I'm struggling to find fault with it in any way: it's got a near-perfect 180 degree viewing angle and perhaps the most accurate color reproduction and color temperature available". Myriam Joire of Engadget writes, "On the non-PenTile One X, colors seemed more natural and the whites were whiter than on AMOLED devices like the Galaxy Nexus."

As one of the newest and highly anticipated flagship phones running Android 4.0 "Ice Cream Sandwich", and with their LTE-capable versions sharing the same Snapdragon S4 SoC, the HTC One X is frequently compared to the Samsung Galaxy S III. Critics generally regarded the One X's build quality and Super LCD2 screen to be better than the Galaxy SIII plasticky body and AMOLED PenTile display, with some noting that the One X's display may not have the same level of blacks or vibrancy as an AMOLED but having more accurate colour reproduction/temperature with less oversaturation, but the Galaxy SIII had a removable battery and a MicroSD slot that the One X lacked. TechRadar ranked HTC One X second to the Galaxy S III on their 20 best mobile phones in the world on September 13, 2012. Despite the positive reception, the One X was viewed as commercially unsuccessful and overshadowed by the Galaxy SIII in terms of sales and marketing, as well as the iPhone 4S.

The HTC One X is also frequently compared to the HTC One S, which sits just below the One X in HTC's 2012 lineup. The LTE-capable One X shares much of its hardware with the One S, including the dual-core Qualcomm Snapdragon S4 MSM8960 SoC. The One X's S-LCD 2 is considered superior to the One S's Super AMOLED Pentile display and the One X (Snapdragon S4 variant, not the Tegra 3) includes an LTE-capable modem that the One S lacks; however the One S has better battery life and a form factor that is easier to hold.

The refreshed HTC One X+ has received a positive but mixed reception. Some reviewers noted that it was a stopgap solution, as that the use of a higher-clocked quad-core Nvidia Tegra 3 SoC (with its 40 nm manufacturing process) was less power efficient than the 28 nm Snapdragon S4, and that HTC missed a chance to use the new quad-core Snapdragon S4 Pro which debuted in the Nexus 4 and LG Optimus G and scored significantly higher in GPU tests. The One X+'s 20-30% speed advantage in benchmarks over the regular One X would be decreased once the latter received an update to Android 4.1 "Jellybean". The One X+ offers 64 GB of storage which offsets a major deficiency on the original LTE-capable One X, which had no MicroSD slot and which only came with 16 GB of storage in Canada and the USA.

Reported problems 
 HTC has confirmed that the Wi-Fi connectivity issues of the Tegra 3 version are a hardware problem, and the problem will be resolved in future versions.
 HTC has conceded that it is normal for the phone to reach temperatures of 55 °C (131 °F) when performing CPU- and GPU-intensive activities (such as playing games) for extended periods of time.
 Some users have reported that their devices are stuck in the "airplane mode turning off" state and that their IMEI has disappeared. Others have reported that they cannot power their devices off due to the same problem.
 Some users have also reported screen blanking off issue.

See also 
 Comparison of smartphones

References

External links 
 

One X
Android (operating system) devices
Mobile phones introduced in 2012
Discontinued smartphones